Phu Quoc fish sauce is a variety of fish sauce produced on Phu Quoc island in southwest Vietnam.  Since 2001, the Industrial Property Department of the government of Vietnam has the name "Phu Quoc Fish Sauce" as a trademark, and only registered manufacturers are allowed to use the name in Vietnam. Such protection, however, does not extend worldwide. In 2012, Phu Quoc fish sauce was granted a European Union Protected Designation of Origin  (PDO) status.

Background
Traditional Phu Quoc fish sauce has been made solely out of fermented anchovies, salt, and water for over 200 years. The waters around the island are rich in seaweed and plankton which provide food for the anchovy population.  However, it is only since the late 1950s that the product has been recognized outside of its home island, reaching its zenith of popularity between 1965 and 1975.  With increasing government subsidies of many industries in the period from 1975 to 1985, the local fish sauce craft lost market share to larger competitors, but in recent years, the popularity of the authentic Phu Quoc product has been rebounding. In 2012, Phu Quoc fish sauce was granted a European Union Protected Designation of Origin  (PDO) status.

Currently, Phu Quoc fish sauce production has reached 8 million liters/year.

Production
The barrels are made from braided rattan from the local mountains, and can be used for up to 60 years.

While any kind of fish can also be used to make the fish sauce, Phu Quoc sauce is made exclusively from anchovies harvested from waters surrounding the island.  During the fishing season (which extends from July to December), fishermen harvest anchovies by net, removing the anchovies from among other fish and items in the nets, and immediately combining them with salt at a 3:1 ratio in water tanks.

Differences
Phu Quoc fish sauce is differentiated by its color, which is due entirely to the ingredients and is not the result of any coloring agents.

Development issues
Currently (as of 2021?), Phu Quoc fish sauce is facing two problems:
 The anchovy population that is the main resource for this product is endangered by overfishing and other environmental degradation.
 The perceived quality of the product has been marred by lesser products using the name prior to the establishment of the trademark protection.  Trademark protection has been denied in some foreign countries due to overuse of the term by other manufacturers prior to the Phu Quoc producers' efforts to obtain trademark protection.

See also

 List of fish sauces

References 

 "Standards Phu Quoc fish sauce." Production Association of Phu Quoc fish sauce. Retrieved April 7, 2010.
 "Phu Quoc fish sauce: Only 5-8% is the real thing." Manufacturing Association of Phu Quoc fish sauce. Retrieved April 7, 2010.
 "The barrel of Phu Quoc." Saigon Businessman (August 5, 2008). Retrieved April 7, 2010.
 "Phu Quoc fish sauce: this Mai, who remember ...?!". Lao Dong (December 24, 2009). Retrieved April 7, 2010.
 "Phu Quoc fish sauce ... call for help. " Saigon Times (March 19, 2005). Retrieved April 7, 2010.
 Ngoc Tuan Van (April 7, 2010). "Origin of Phu Quoc fish sauce: There may be denied registration." Saigon Economic Times. Retrieved April 7, 2010.

External links
Phu Quoc Fish Sauce Guide 

Fish sauces
Anchovy dishes